Hillsboro Beach, officially the Town of Hillsboro Beach, is a town in Broward County, Florida, United States. Its population was 1,875 at the 2010 census. It is part of the Miami metropolitan area, which had 5,564,635 people at the 2010 census.

History

The town was named for the Earl of Hillsborough, who received large grants of land from the King of England while Florida was an English possession.

The  strip along Florida State Road A1A is officially known as "Hillsboro Mile" in the town's boundaries, and it's the only main road in town. Because this is the only main public road, it is aligned with the residents' mansions and commonly called "Millionaires' Mile" by both local residents and visitors alike.

Since the town's earliest years, the population doubles during wintertime.

Geography

Hillsboro Beach is located at  (26.293857, –80.078243).  It is located in northeastern Broward County, along the Atlantic Ocean. It is on south end of the barrier island locally known as Deerfield Beach Island or Deerfield Cay.

It is adjacent to the following municipalities:

To its north:
Deerfield Beach

To its west:
Lighthouse Point (across the Intracoastal Waterway)

To its south:
Pompano Beach

To its east:
Atlantic Ocean

Climate

As the case with all of South Florida, The town of Hillsboro Beach has a tropical climate.

Hillsboro Beach falls under the USDA 10b Plant Hardiness zone.

Demographics

2020 census

As of the 2020 United States census, there were 1,987 people, 999 households, and 573 families residing in the town.

2010 census

As of 2010, there were 2,224 households, out of which 49.1% were vacant. In 2000, 3.0% had children under the age of 18 living with them, 50.2% were married couples living together, 3.1% had a female householder with no husband present, and 45.7% were non-families. 40.0% of all households were made up of individuals, and 24.0% had someone living alone who was 65 years of age or older. The average household size was 1.69 and the average family size was 2.13.

In 2000, the town population was spread out, with 3.2% under the age of 18, 1.1% from 18 to 24, 10.7% from 25 to 44, 34.0% from 45 to 64, and 51.0% who were 65 years of age or older. The median age was 65 years. For every 100 females, there were 81.2 males. For every 100 females age 18 and over, there were 79.9 males.

In 2000, the median income for a household in the town was $52,159, and the median income for a family was $70,163. Males had a median income of $61,974 versus $40,089 for females. The per capita income for the town was $56,634.  About 4.1% of families and 8.0% of the population were below the poverty line, including none of those under age 18 and 8.6% of those age 65 or over.

As of 2000, speakers of English as their first language were 89.94% of the population, French speakers 4.04%, Italian speakers 2.64%, Spanish speakers 2.40%, while German speakers were at 0.96% of residents.

As of 2000, Hillsboro Beach was the twenty-second most Canadian-populated area in the US, along with several other areas, at 1.5% of residents.

Education

Broward County Public Schools serves the community. All residents are zoned to Cresthaven Elementary School (Pompano Beach), Crystal Lake Middle School (Pompano Beach), and Deerfield Beach High School (located in Deerfield Beach).

Media

Hillsboro Beach is part of the Miami-Fort Lauderdale-Hollywood media market, which is the twelfth-largest radio market and the seventeenth-largest television market in the United States. Its primary daily newspapers are the South Florida Sun-Sentinel and The Miami Herald, and their Spanish-language counterparts El Sentinel and El Nuevo Herald.

References

External links
Town of Hillsboro Beach official website

Towns in Broward County, Florida
Towns in Florida
Populated coastal places in Florida on the Atlantic Ocean
Beaches of Broward County, Florida
Beaches of Florida